Basel Al Ali (born 1 January 1982 in Syria) is a Syrian footballer who currently plays for Al-Faisaly in Jordan.

References

External links
 

1982 births
Living people
Syrian footballers
Association football defenders
Expatriate footballers in Bahrain
Expatriate footballers in Jordan
Syrian expatriate footballers
Syrian expatriate sportspeople in Bahrain
Syrian expatriate sportspeople in Jordan
Syrian expatriate sportspeople in Saudi Arabia
Al-Nahda Club (Saudi Arabia) players
Saudi First Division League players
Syrian Premier League players